Edith Mary Hinchley, born Edith Mary Mason (1870 – 16 October 1940) was a British painter, suffragist, and humanist.

Biography
Hinchley was born in 1870 in the Chelsea area of London where her father was a florist and nurseryman and her mother and sisters ran a shop. Her father died in the 1880s and by the 1890s Hinchley was a student at the Royal College of Art, where she won a silver medal. From 1897 to 1928 Hinchley showed some 27 works at the Royal Academy in London and also with the Royal Glasgow Institute of the Fine Arts, the Royal Hibernian Academy and in Liverpool and at the Paris Salon. She was elected a member of the Royal Society of Miniature Painters in 1896 and to the Society of Women Artists in 1922.

In 1890 she worked on a family tree that involved the creation of 500 heraldic shields on deerskin. She is credited with doing the work because she was a genealogist and a friend of the family concerned. The Lucy Deerskin is held at Charlecote Park in Warwickshire and owned by the National Trust. The heraldry used has been investigated by Christoper Purvis and nearly all of the arms had been identified by 2012.

In 1903 she married the chemical engineer John William Hinchley who she had met whilst at the Royal College of Art in London. She had studied art and she had some difficulty because not only was her hearing not perfect but she was obliged to sit at the back of the class because she was a woman. She could not move forward as there was a matron employed to chaperone the female students and who sat between the genders. Her husband left in 1903 for Siam where he was to be the assayist at the Bangkok mint. She sailed out to join him in 1904, where she painted, and they returned to Britain in 1907.

In 1911 Hinchley spoke up for women artists, noting that they had quickly responded to the needs of the suffrage movement. Her article was published in the newspaper of Women's Freedom League which was called The Vote. The Women's Freedom League was a militant suffrage movement that had splintered from the Pankhursts seeking more democracy.

In 1913 Hinchley donated three embroidered robes to the Victoria and Albert Museum. They were from North Africa and one was silk.

In 1923 Hinchley was commissioned to paint a miniature of Princess Helene Victoria which was to be hung in the library of Queen Mary's Dolls' House. The painting is still extant and may be painted on vellum.

Her husband, who was a leading chemical engineer and freemason, died on 13 August 1931. In 1935 she began to donate antiquities to the British Museum. The objects included metal coins and porcelain items dating back as far as 150 BCE.

In 1937 or 1938 she painted Evan Frederick Morgan, 4th Baron, 2nd Viscount Tredegar. This painting is in the National Trust collection.

Death and legacy
 
Hinchley died in London in 1940. Her house, in Kensington, was completely destroyed by a bomb during The Blitz; her body and that of her two lodgers were not found until five days later, when notices were run to establish who may be beneficiaries of her estate. She has a painting in the Wellcome Collection titled a Leper in Prapatoom which she completed in 1905.

References

1870 births
1940 deaths
19th-century English women artists
20th-century English women artists
Alumni of the Royal College of Art
British civilians killed in World War II
Deaths by airstrike during World War II
English women painters
English humanists
English suffragists
Heraldic artists
Painters from London
People from Chelsea, London